Ayoze Pérez Gutiérrez (born 29 July 1993) is a Spanish professional footballer who plays as a forward or attacking midfielder for La Liga club Real Betis, on loan from Premier League club Leicester City.

He began his career at hometown club CD Tenerife, where he received several personal awards for his performances in the 2013–14 Segunda División season before joining Newcastle for around €3 million.

Pérez has represented Spain internationally at under-21 level.

Club career

Tenerife
Born in Santa Cruz de Tenerife, Canary Islands, Pérez finished his formation with local club Tenerife, making his senior debut with the B-team in the 2011–12 season, in the fourth division. He appeared with the main squad in the third level in the following campaign, featuring in 16 matches and scoring once as the Blanquiazules returned to division two after a two-year absence.

After impressing in the 2013 pre-season, Pérez played his first professional match on 18 August, starting in a 1–0 away defeat against Alcorcón. He scored his first goal in the "silver category" on 29 September, in a 1–0 home win over Real Madrid Castilla.

On 23 March of the following year Pérez scored his first hat-trick of his career, starting in a 5–0 thrashing against Ponferradina. This was one of the performances which earned him the league's Player of the Month award, which he retained for a second consecutive time while his manager Álvaro Cervera won the equivalent.

In October 2014, Pérez won the Breakthrough Player in the 2013–14 Segunda División and Best Attacking Midfielder in the 2013–14 Segunda División awards at the LFP Awards Ceremony.

Newcastle United
On 5 June 2014, Pérez rejected interest from Real Madrid, Barcelona and Porto to join Premier League club Newcastle United for an estimated €3 million fee. The deal was confirmed a day later. He made his league debut on 17 August, replacing fellow debutant Emmanuel Rivière in the 83rd minute of a 2–0 home defeat against then champions Manchester City.

Pérez scored his first goal in his first league start on 26 October, in a 2–1 away win over Tottenham Hotspur. Six days later, as a half-time substitute for Papiss Cissé, he scored the only goal of the game to defeat Liverpool and give Newcastle their fourth successive win. On 9 November, Pérez made it three league goals in as many games in a 2–0 away win against West Bromwich Albion. He scored less frequently in the second half of the season as Newcastle struggled, but his equaliser against the same opponents on 9 May 2015 ended a run of eight consecutive defeats under John Carver, as Newcastle avoided relegation.

Pérez scored Newcastle's first in a 2–2 draw with title holders Chelsea on 26 September 2015. On 18 October, he recorded a goal in a 6–2 rout of Norwich City, Newcastle's first win of the season. He scored the only goal of an away win at Bournemouth on 7 November, with Newcastle's only shot on target. On 13 December, as a substitute, he scored an added-time winner at Tottenham Hotspur, moving Newcastle out of the relegation places.

On 1 February 2016, Newcastle United announced that Pérez signed a new contract, committing himself to the club until the summer of 2021.

Pérez stayed with Newcastle despite a drop into the Championship, helping the club return to the Premiership immediately after one season. Pérez ended the season with 9 goals in 25 appearances, with 11 of them coming as starts, scoring key goals against title rivals Brighton as well as Barnsley to help seal the Championship title on the final day of the season.

He scored his first Premier League goal of the season in a 2–2 draw at Southampton on 15 October. He then scored in consecutive matches in a 1–0 away win over Stoke City and a brace in a 3–1 home win over Luton in the FA Cup. On 31 March 2018, Pérez ended his 8-match goalless run by scoring the only goal in a victory over Huddersfield, in the 80th minute. Pérez continued his good form with a goal and an assist each, in wins over Leicester City and Arsenal. 

On 20 April 2019, he scored his first hat-trick for the club in a 3–1 win over Southampton. In doing so, he became the first player to score a Premier League hat-trick for Newcastle since Georginio Wijnaldum in 2015.

Leicester City
On 4 July 2019, Pérez signed a four-year contract with Leicester City for a fee of £30m. He made his competitive debut for Leicester City in a 0–0 draw with Wolverhampton Wanderers on 11 August. On 25 October 2019, Perez scored his first goal for Leicester City, going on to complete a hat-trick in a 9–0 away win over Southampton.

On 11 April 2021, Pérez was one of three players dropped from Leicester's squad for the game against West Ham United after breaching COVID-19 protocols.

Loan to Real Betis
On 31 January 2023, Pérez joined Real Betis on loan for the remainder of the 2022–23 season. He scored his first goal for the club in a Europa League match against Manchester United at Old Trafford on 9 March 2023.

International career
On 29 August 2014, Pérez received his first call-up to the Spain national under-21 team for the 2015 European Under-21 Championships qualifying matches against Hungary and Austria. He made his under-21 debut as a 77th-minute substitute for Munir El Haddadi against Hungary on 4 September.

Personal life
Pérez's older brother, Samuel, is also a forward, who has played for Blyth Spartans and Berwick Rangers. He currently plays for Alnwick Town in the Northern Football Alliance Premier Division. His cousin María José Pérez is a forward for Levante UD Femenino and the Spain women's national team.

After leaving Newcastle, Perez became the subject of a comedy drama based on a true story when a teenage girl convinced her parents to buy the property next to his. On the day they moved in, Perez was transferred to Leicester City. The show, starring ex-Emmerdale star Charlie Hardwick and local stand-up comedian, Mike Milligan was recorded by the Newcastle Evening Chronicle as “the most incredible story to come out of the WAGS generation”.

Career statistics

Honours
Newcastle United
EFL Championship: 2016–17

Leicester City
FA Cup: 2020–21
FA Community Shield: 2021

Individual
Segunda División Player of the Month: March 2014, April 2014
Segunda División Breakthrough Player: 2013–14
Segunda División Best Attacking Midfielder: 2013–14
Segunda División Team of the Season: 2013–14

References

External links

Newcastle official profile

1993 births
Living people
Footballers from Santa Cruz de Tenerife
Spanish footballers
Spain under-21 international footballers
Association football forwards
CD Tenerife B players
CD Tenerife players
Newcastle United F.C. players
Leicester City F.C. players
Real Betis players
Tercera División players
Segunda División B players
Segunda División players
Premier League players
English Football League players
FA Cup Final players
Spanish expatriate footballers
Expatriate footballers in England
Spanish expatriate sportspeople in England